Peter Ihrie Jr. (February 3, 1796 – March 29, 1871) was a Jacksonian member of the U.S. House of Representatives from Pennsylvania.

Biography
Peter Ihrie Jr. was born in Easton, Pennsylvania.  He graduated from Dickinson College in Carlisle, Pennsylvania, in 1815.  He studied law, was admitted to the bar in 1818 and commenced practice in Easton.  He was a charter member of the board of trustees of Lafayette College in 1826.  He served as a member of the Pennsylvania House of Representatives in 1826 and 1827.  He served as brigadier general of State militia in 1845.

Ihrie was elected as a Jacksonian candidate to the Twenty-first Congress to fill in part the vacancies caused by the resignations of George Wolf and Samuel D. Ingham.  He was reelected as a Jacksonian to the Twenty-second Congress.  He was a member of the board of directors of the Easton Bank and died in Easton, Pennyslania.  Interment in Easton Cemetery.

Sources

The Political Graveyard

1796 births
1871 deaths
Dickinson College alumni
Members of the Pennsylvania House of Representatives
Politicians from Easton, Pennsylvania
Jacksonian members of the United States House of Representatives from Pennsylvania
19th-century American politicians
Lafayette College trustees